Cabin Creek is an unincorporated community in Adams and Arapahoe counties in the U.S. state of Colorado. It is located within the Denver metropolitan area. 

Deer Trail 26J School District serves Cabin Creek.

See also

References

Unincorporated communities in Adams County, Colorado
Unincorporated communities in Colorado
Denver metropolitan area